Konrad III of Laichling (died April 23, 1204) was the 25th Bishop of Regensburg from 1186 to 1204.

In 1189, Konrad III participated in the Third Crusade until 1191. In 1197, he set out again in the Henry VI's crusade. However, the death of the emperor made him return home. Later on, he supported Philip of Swabia as a pretender to the throne.
Expansions of territory by Louis I, Duke of Bavaria led to a feud with Bishop Konrad III, in which the Bishopric and its ecclesiastical goods were severely devastated.

References

Bibliography

 1204 deaths
Roman Catholic bishops of Regensburg
12th-century German Roman Catholic bishops
13th-century German Roman Catholic bishops
Christians of the Third Crusade
Christians of the Crusade of 1197